This list of tallest buildings in Jacksonville ranks by height the skyscrapers and high-rises in the city of Jacksonville, Florida, United States. The tallest building in Jacksonville is the Bank of America Tower, which is 617 feet (188 m) tall.

Tallest buildings

This list ranks Jacksonville skyscrapers that stand at least 162 feet (50 m) tall, based on standard height measurement. This includes spires and architectural details but does not include antenna masts. Existing structures are included for ranking purposes based on height at time of inclusion.

Timeline of tallest buildings in Jacksonville
This is a list of buildings that were the tallest in Jacksonville when they were built, beginning in the early 20th century, when the skyscraper boom began in Florida.

See also

 Architecture of Jacksonville
 List of tallest buildings in Florida
 List of tallest buildings in Fort Lauderdale
 List of tallest buildings in Miami
 List of tallest buildings in Miami Beach
 List of tallest buildings in Orlando
 List of tallest buildings in St. Petersburg
 List of tallest buildings in Sunny Isles Beach
 List of tallest buildings in Tampa

References

External links
 Diagram of Jacksonville skyscrapers on SkyscraperPage
 Florida High-Rises at urbanFLORIDA

 
Jacksonville
Tallest in Jacksonville
Jacksonville, Florida-related lists
Architecture in Jacksonville, Florida